Bitter Melon, is an independent 2018 American dark comedy film written and directed by H.P. Mendoza. It debuted at the 2018 San Francisco International Asian American Film Festival and was released theatrically by ABS-CBN on December 7, 2018 and on home video by Gravitas Ventures on October 1, 2019. The film's title refers to the tropical vegetable with a bitter flavor known in the Philippines as ampalaya.

The screenplay was based on Mendoza's experiences with physical abuse in his nuclear family as well as his extended family, originally written in 1997 under the title He Ain't Heavy, He's My Brother based on the song by The Hollies.

On December 11, 2019, Bitter Melon was named one of "The 20 Best Bay Area Movies of the Decade" by The Mercury News after having placed on numerous "Best of 2018" lists.

Plot 
The film follows Declan as he returns to his hometown of San Francisco for Christmas only to realize that his second oldest brother, Troy, has been ruling the house with fear, physically abusing his wife, Shelly, and emotionally abusing his mother Prisa and daughter Mina. When eldest brother Moe arrives to complete the Christmas reunion, the festivities begin as the extended family shows up and the big Filipino Christmas can begin. But when cousin Tiva offers domestic violence support to the withdrawn Shelly, abusive Troy finds out and assaults Shelly for Declan and Moe to find when they get home. The next day, Declan and Moe are disturbed to discover that everyone in the house (Prisa, Shelly, Mina and Troy) all act as if nothing happened, even as Shelly nurses a bruised face. This leads Declan to propose a radical idea to the family: to kill Troy.

Cast

Themes
Mendoza has said that the script for Bitter Melon is his "only screenplay that doesn’t pass the Bechdel test, and for good reason. It’s a movie about how men treat women.” The commentary track on the home video release has Mendoza explaining that every seemingly random conversation in the film examines masculinity from different angles; from toxic masculinity in the household, to the perception of masculinity in the LGBT community, to the future of masculinity in the wake of its patriarchal past.

Music
This is the first feature film directed by H.P. Mendoza to not be completely scored by him. His original intention was to have a "needle drop film" with a soundtrack consisting only of licensed music from his childhood, mixing local heroes like Carlos Santana with 1960s R&B groups like The Delfonics as well as actual 1950s recordings of Filipino folk songs by Bayanihan Philippine National Folk Dance Company. But the most crucial "needle drop" for Mendoza was the use of the song "He Ain't Heavy, He's My Brother" by The Hollies. After several fruitless attempts by music supervisor Terri D'Ambrosio to clear the rights to the actual song, Mendoza wrote his own musical number ("Wind Chime") for the finale of the film.

Though Mendoza could not clear the rights for any of the American songs, he was able to secure all of the Filipino folk songs. The rest of the songs were replaced by a new original score that both Mendoza and Marco D'Ambrosio co-composed.

Budget
The film was initially funded by Cinematografo, an initiative created by ABS-CBN to grant $100,000 to Filipino-American filmmakers, but during production, H.P. Mendoza's production company, Ersatz Film, raised $100,000 more, half of which was raised on Kickstarter where it was featured as one of Kickstarter's "Projects We Love".

Critical reception

On review aggregator Rotten Tomatoes, Bitter Melon holds an approval rating of  based on  reviews. Critic Dennis Harvey of Variety called the film "H.P. Mendoza's best directorial feature to date." Ben Kenigsberg of The New York Times called the film "absorbing" and "distinguished by its willingness to [go] to some disturbing places", but criticized the ending for "grind[ing] to a halt in its final third as the characters talk things out, which might be helpful in life but in drama tends to belabor the obvious."

In a 50/50 review from Film Threat, Norm Gidney says, "There are scenes of utter brilliance and honesty, then clunky scenes of melodrama the next", while Tim Sika of the San Francisco Film Critics Circle called the film "an indie masterpiece" and "an absolutely beautiful movie about monsters and how they're made."

Best of Lists
 The 20 Best Bay Area Movies of the Decade - The Mercury News
 Best Films of 2018 - San Francisco Film Critics Circle
 Best Films of the Asian Diaspora 2018 - Polygon
 Best of 2018 - Entropy
 31 Favorite Films of Outfest 2018 - The Advocate
 Top 10 Films of CAAMFEST - San Francisco Chronicle
 5 Movies to See at CAAMFEST - Marin Independent Journal
 Must See Films at San Diego Asian Film Festival - San Diego Reader
 Top 12 Films at NewFest - Gay City News
 Top Films at Tallgrass Film Festival - Wichita Eagle
 Inspiring FilAms of 2018 - Philippine News

Awards
 Best Narrative Feature - San Diego Asian Film Festival 2018
 Outstanding Ensemble Cast - Tallgrass Film Festival

Home media
Bitter Melon was made available on Special Edition Blu-ray and DVD as well as in Digital HD via Gravitas Ventures on October 1, 2019.

References

External links
 
 

2018 films
Films shot in San Francisco
Films about Filipino Americans
American independent films
2018 independent films
Films about Filipino families
Films set in San Francisco
Films about domestic violence
Films about dysfunctional families
2018 black comedy films
Asian-American LGBT-related films
Philippine LGBT-related films
Gay-related films
Comedy-drama films about Asian Americans
American crime drama films
American black comedy films
2010s American films